For the concept of schoolbooks, see the article textbook.

For the article about the typeface Schoolbook, see the article Century Schoolbook.